Li Li (1908 – January 19, 2006) was a People's Republic of China politician. He was born in Yongxin County, Jiangxi Province. He was governor of Guizhou Province.

1908 births
2006 deaths
People's Republic of China politicians from Jiangxi
Chinese Communist Party politicians from Jiangxi
Governors of Guizhou
Politicians from Ji'an